The following is a list of the 23 cantons of the Somme department, in France, following the French canton reorganisation which came into effect in March 2015:

 Abbeville-1
 Abbeville-2
 Ailly-sur-Noye
 Ailly-sur-Somme
 Albert
 Amiens-1
 Amiens-2
 Amiens-3
 Amiens-4
 Amiens-5
 Amiens-6
 Amiens-7
 Corbie
 Doullens
 Flixecourt
 Friville-Escarbotin
 Gamaches
 Ham
 Moreuil
 Péronne
 Poix-de-Picardie
 Roye
 Rue

References